Tetyana or Tetiana is the Ukrainian variation on the female Slavic name Tatiana.

Sportspeople

Athletics
Tetyana Bonenko  (born 1976), Ukrainian sprinter
Tetyana Dorovskikh (born 1961), retired middle distance runner
Tetyana Filonyuk  (born 1984), Ukrainian long-distance runner
Tetyana Hamera-Shmyrko (born 1983), Ukrainian long-distance runner
Tetyana Hladyr (born 1975), Ukrainian long-distance runner
Tetyana Holovchenko (born 1980), Ukrainian middle- and long-distance runner
Tetyana Kryvobok (born 1972), Ukrainian middle distance runner
Tetyana Lyakhovych (born 1979), Ukrainian javelin thrower
Tetiana Petlyuk (born 1982), Ukrainian middle-distance runner
Tetyana Skachko (born 1954), Soviet-Ukrainian long-jumper
Tetyana Tereshchuk-Antipova (born 1969), Ukrainian 400 m hurdler
Tetyana Tkalich (born 1975), Ukrainian sprinter
Tetyana Yakybchuk (born 1968), Ukrainian Paralympic thrower

Other sports
Tetyana Antypenko (born 1981), Ukrainian cross-country skier
Tetyana Arefyeva, Ukrainian tennis player
Tetyana Berezhna (born 1982), archer from Ukraine
Tetyana Bilenko (born 1983), Ukrainian table tennis player
Tetyana Chorna (born 1981), Ukrainian international footballer
Tetyana Dorokhova (born 1985), Ukrainian archer
Tetyana Hlushchenko (born 1956), former Soviet/Ukrainian handball player
Tetyana Horb (born 1965), Ukrainian former handball player 
Tetyana Khala (born 1987), Ukrainian swimmer
Tetyana Kocherhina (born 1956), former Soviet/Ukrainian handball player
Tetiana Kolesnikova (born 1977), Ukrainian Olympic rower
Tetyana Lazareva (born 1981), Ukrainian wrestler
Tetiana Luzhanska (born 1984), Ukrainian-American tennis player
Tetyana Romanenko (born 1990), Ukrainian international footballer
Tetyana Semykina (born 1973), Ukrainian sprint canoeist
Tetyana Shynkarenko (born 1978), Ukrainian team handball player
Tetyana Sorochynska (born 1983), Ukrainian table tennis player
Tetyana Tikun (born 1994), Ukrainian alpine skier
Tetiana Ustiuzhanina  (born 1965), Ukrainian Olympic rower
Tetyana Vodopyanova (born 1973), former Ukrainian biathlete
Tetiana Zakharova-Nadyrova (born 1951), Ukrainian basketball player

Other people
Tetiana Andriienko (1938–2016), Ukrainian botanist, professor
Tetiana Balahura (born 1960), Ukrainian language teacher
Tetyana Kardynalovska (1899–1993), Ukrainian interpreter and writer
Tetyana Yablonska (1917–2005), Ukrainian painter

See also
Tatian (disambiguation)